Unleashed 2005 is a New Zealand compilation rock album released in 2005.

Track listing
"Remedy" - Seether
"Vertigo" - U2
"Mr. Brightside" - The Killers
"Be Yourself" - Audioslave
"Beverly Hills" - Weezer
"Photograph" - Nickelback
"Behind Those Eyes" - 3 Doors Down
"So Cold" - Breaking Benjamin
"Word Up!" - Korn
"Happy?" - Mudvayne
"Little Sister" - Queens of the Stone Age
"Talk Shows on Mute" - Incubus
"Disappear" - Hoobastank
"Broken Wings" - Alter Bridge
"Better Off Alone" - Grinspoon
"Zebra" - John Butler Trio
"Cold Hard Bitch" - Jet
"Yours Truly" - Blindspott
"Sake Bomb" - The D4
"I Hate Everything About You" - Three Days Grace

References

Compilation albums by New Zealand artists
2005 albums